Sam Matavesi (born 13 January 1992) is a Fijian rugby union player who plays for the Northampton Saints in the Premiership Rugby competition but also had a short stint with Top 14 side, Toulouse. His position of choice is hooker even though he has played at Blindside flanker and Number 8 for Plymouth.

Career 
Sam is the younger brother of Josh Matavesi. His father, Sireli Matavesi came to England in the 1980s from Fiji and never left. He played for Cornwall, a team his 3 sons also played for. Sam also works for the Royal Navy, working out of the RNAS Culdrose as well as playing for their rugby union team. 

He made his debut for the Flying Fijians against Canada in the 2013 IRB Pacific Nations Cup off the bench at Number 8. In December 2019, Matavesi joins Northampton Saints in the Premiership Rugby with immediate effect from the 2019-20 season.

References

External links 
 

Fijian rugby union players
1992 births
Living people
Rugby union hookers
Rugby union flankers
Rugby union number eights
Cornish Pirates players
Stade Toulousain players
Fiji international rugby union players